Chrysaethe is a genus of beetles in the family Cerambycidae, containing the following species:

 Chrysaethe amboroensis Clarke, 2010
 Chrysaethe amoena (Gounelle, 1911)
 Chrysaethe asperiventris (Bates, 1872)
 Chrysaethe atrata (Bates, 1872)
 Chrysaethe atrocephala (Fisher, 1947)
 Chrysaethe aurantipennis (Giesbert, 1991)
 Chrysaethe aurata (Bates, 1870)
 Chrysaethe aureicollis (Aurivillius, 1920)
 Chrysaethe beltiana (Bates, 1872)
 Chrysaethe cyanipennis (Bates, 1872)
 Chrysaethe globulicollis (Melzer, 1935)
 Chrysaethe iodes (Bates, 1885)
 Chrysaethe jorgei (Tavakilian & Penaherrera-Leiva, 2003)
 Chrysaethe ochraceicollis (Zajciw, 1965)
 Chrysaethe smaragdina (Bates, 1870)
 Chrysaethe viriditincta (Giesbert, 1991)

References

 
Rhinotragini
Cerambycidae genera